The history and development of British currency in the Middle East emerged from the 19th century. British involvement in the Middle East began with the Aden Settlement in 1839. The British East India Company established an anti-piracy station in Aden to protect British shipping that was sailing to and from India. The Trucial States were similarly brought into the British Empire as a base for suppressing sea piracy in the Persian Gulf. Involvement in the region expanded to Egypt because of the Suez canal, as well as to Bahrain, Qatar, and Muscat. Kuwait was added in 1899 because of fears about the proposed Berlin-Baghdad Railway. There was a growing fear in the United Kingdom that Germany was a rising power, and there was concern about the implications of access to the Persian Gulf that would arise from the Berlin-Baghdad Railway. After the First World War the British influence in the Middle East reached its fullest extent with the inclusion of Palestine, Transjordan and Iraq. 

At first, Indian rupees were introduced to Aden and the Gulf States, and later during the First World War to Mesopotamia. After the First World War, the Indian rupee was replaced in British East Africa by a florin and then a shilling, which eventually replaced the Indian rupee in Aden by 1951. Meanwhile, in 1927, a new Palestine pound at par with the pound sterling was introduced in the mandate territories of Palestine and Transjordan to replace the Turkish and Egyptian currencies. The East African Shilling in Aden was replaced in 1965 with the South Arabian dinar at par with the pound sterling.

Introduction
For nearly four hundred years, silver Spanish dollars (pieces of eight) had served as the international currency, and most of these coins were minted in Mexico City, Lima, and Potosí in the New World. The policy of introducing the sterling currency into all of the British colonies began with an imperial order-in-council dated 1825. The timing of the British imperial order-in-council corresponded to the drying up of the source of the Spanish dollars following revolutions in Latin America, and also the introduction of a successful gold standard into the United Kingdom in 1821, based on the gold sovereign.

In 1825, the British Empire had not as yet reached its widest extent. Following the American Revolution, Britain's attention switched to India, but British India was originally controlled by the British East India Company. The British government did not take direct control over India until after the Indian mutiny of 1857. Hence the imperial order-of-council of 1825 did not apply to India. As such, the already circulating silver rupee continued to be the currency of India for the entire duration of the British Raj, and afterwards into independence. The Indian rupee was not only the currency of India but also the currency of an extended region beyond, which stretched across the Indian Ocean to the east coast of Africa, up through the horn of Africa, through Aden and Muscat in Southern Arabia and Eastern Arabia, and along the Arabian coast of the Persian Gulf, extending even as far inland as Mesopotamia. These Middle East territories did not become a part of the British Empire until a period ranging from the 1840s until after the First World War.

The Middle East was the last major addition to the British Empire, and therefore just like India, was unaffected by the 1825 imperial order-in-council. The 1825 order-in-council was limited largely to the remnants of the old Empire in North America and the West Indies, along with New South Wales, Gibraltar, and some spoils of the Napoleonic wars such as the Cape of Good Hope, Malta, and Mauritius. It is said that the British Empire had three currency zones, and that the three currencies were the pound sterling, the dollar, and the rupee. The situation in the British territories of the Middle East was however somewhat complicated, because it involved a situation in which Indian rupees, Turkish piastres, and Egyptian piastres gradually gave way to systems based on units of the sterling system, but without ever involving the introduction of the full sterling coinage.

Middle East
The situation as regards currency in the British territories in the Middle East was quite different from the situation as regards the currencies of the British West Indies.

East Africa and the Middle East were late additions to the British Empire, and by then, the British government had already learned from experience in Canada, India and Hong Kong that it is highly impractical to impose a new currency in the place of already existing practices. 

The sterling unit of account entered the Middle East through Palestine, in the form of the Palestine pound, which was introduced into Palestine in 1927 to end the confusion that had arisen as a result of the twin circulation of Turkish and Egyptian money in the territory. The Palestine pound was created at par with the pound sterling, but it was not used in conjunction with the pounds, shillings and pence coinage. It was used in conjunction with a decimal system. 

In the Middle East, sterling coinage never formed a part of the circulating currency. That was in contrast to the situation in the Eastern Caribbean, where sterling coinage was used in conjunction with a Spanish dollar unit of account. 

The Palestine pound was also used in Transjordan where it later became referred to as the dinar. The name dinar then became the preferred name for the pound sterling unit of account as it spread to other Middle East territories. Iraq adopted the dinar in 1931 to replace the Indian rupee that had been introduced by the British during the First World War.

Meanwhile, after the First World War, the price of silver rose dramatically. In British East Africa, at the moment when the silver rupee rose to the value of two shillings sterling, the authorities opportunistically introduced a florin system to replace the rupee, with the florin being equal to the rupee at two shillings. Shortly after that, in 1922, the monetary system in British East Africa was changed again, this time to a shilling system. The East African shilling was now on par with the shilling sterling, but although the earliest versions of the East African shilling and the East African florin corresponded in shape, size, and weight with the corresponding sterling coins, the full set of sterling coinage was never introduced into British East Africa, as it was in British West Africa and in the British territories in Southern Africa. The East African shilling was originally used in Kenya, Uganda and Tanganyika but it soon spread to Zanzibar and British Somaliland, eventually crossing from the Horn of Africa to Aden on the Arabian coast in 1951, where it replaced the rupee in that territory. In 1961, Kuwait adopted the dinar as a new unit of account to replace the Indian rupee, and in 1965 the dinar unit replaced the shilling in Aden at twenty shillings to the dinar. In 1966 the rupee was replaced by the dinar in Bahrain, and in Abu Dhabi, while in Qatar, Dubai and the remaining Trucial States, the rupee was replaced by the Saudi riyal which was a direct descendant of the Maria Theresa Thaler. The Maria Theresa Thaler was a variety of the silver Thaler coin first minted in Joachimsthal, Bohemia, and the Thaler is the German coin upon which the Spanish eight real coin was modelled. It is these Spanish dollars (or pieces of eight) that are the parent coinage of the modern US dollar. The word 'dollar' originates from the word Thaler.

In 1970, The Sultanate of Oman replaced the rupee with the Omani rial unit that was on par with the pound sterling. Meanwhile, the dinar units in the other parts of the Persian Gulf region had already risen in value against the pound sterling as a result of sterling's devaluation in 1967, and so the new Omani rial was not equal in value to the dinars in the nearby territories.

The currency units that are used in Israel, Jordan, Iraq, Kuwait, Bahrain, Oman, and the Yemen are all descended from the pound sterling, while the currency units that are used in Saudi Arabia, Qatar, and the United Arab Emirates are all descended from the Maria Theresa Thaler. This largely explains the factor of ten difference in value on average between Bahrain, Kuwait and Oman on the one hand, and Saudi Arabia, Qatar, and the United Arab Emirates on the other hand. Bahrain, Kuwait and Oman are using units that are descended from sterling, whereas Saudi Arabia, Qatar, and the United Arab Emirates are using units that are descended from the Maria Theresa Thaler.

Cyprus

The British introduced sterling to Cyprus in 1879, a year after taking de facto control of the island from the Ottoman Empire. The exchange rate was £1 stg = 180 Turkish piastres. The Cyprus Currency Board was established in 1927 and held the responsibility of administering the Cypriot pound. The Cypriot pound maintained its fixed exchange rate with sterling until 1972, some twelve years after Cyprus gained independence from the United Kingdom.

Initially the Cyprus pound was divided into 20 shillings, in common with its United Kingdom counterpart. However, unlike the United Kingdom shilling, the Cyprus shilling was divided into 9 piastres, thus establishing a nomenclature link to the earlier Ottoman currency. The piastre was itself divided into 40 para (like the kuruş). The para denomination did not appear on any coins or banknotes but was used on postage stamps.

Egypt

The Egyptian pound (known as the geneih) replaced the Egyptian piastre in 1834, with 100 piastre = 1 pound. The Egyptian pound was also used in Anglo-Egyptian Sudan between 1899 and 1956, and Cyrenaica when it was under British occupation and later an independent emirate between 1942 and 1951. It also circulated in Mandatory Palestine from 1918 to 1927, when the Palestine pound was introduced.

Palestine

Following the institution of the British Mandate for Palestine in 1918, the Egyptian pound was introduced into Palestine, and circulated alongside the Ottoman lira. To end the confusion that had arisen as a result of the twin circulation of Turkish and Egyptian money in the territory, in 1927 the British authorities established the Currency Board for Palestine, which introduced the Palestine pound, equal in value to the pound sterling, which was legal tender in Mandatory Palestine and in Transjordan.

The Currency Board was dissolved in May 1948, with the end of the British Mandate, but the Palestinian pound continued in circulation for a transitional period:
 
 Israel adopted the Israeli pound (or Israeli lira) in 1952. 

 Jordan adopted the Jordanian dinar in 1949. 

 In the West Bank, the Palestine pound continued to circulate until 1950, when the West Bank was annexed by Jordan, and the Jordanian dinar became legal tender there.

 In the Gaza Strip, the Palestine pound continued to circulate until April 1951, when it was replaced by the Egyptian pound, three years after the Egyptian army took control of the territory.

Sterling area
At the outbreak of the Second World War, the sterling area was formed as an emergency measure to protect the external value of the pound sterling, mainly against the US dollar. All the territories mentioned above joined the sterling area since their respective pounds, dinars, shillings, or rupees were pegged at a fixed value to the pound sterling. The Indian rupee at that time was pegged to the pound sterling at a fixed value of one shilling and six pence sterling. In the years after the war, Egypt, Palestine, the Sudan and Iraq left the sterling area.

As a result of the sterling devaluation of November 1967, the floating of the pound sterling in June 1972, and the ending of the Bretton Woods system of fixed exchange rates that was introduced in 1944, none of the currencies mentioned above retain any fixed parity to any of the sterling units of account. There is no visible relationship between these currencies today and the currency that is used in the United Kingdom.

See also

British currency in Oceania
British currency in the South Atlantic and the Antarctic
British currency in the West Indies
British currency in West Africa
East African shilling
Old Israeli shekel
Palestine pound
South Yemeni dinar

References

 Chalmers, R., "A History of Currency in the British Colonies" (1893)

Currencies of Asia
British colonisation of Asia
Currencies of the United Kingdom